The Balanidae comprise a family of barnacles of the order Balanomorpha. As a result of research published in 2021 by Chan et al., the members of the family Archaeobalanidae were merged with this family.

Genera
These genera belong to the family Balanidae:

 Acasta Leach, 1817
 Actinobalanus Moroni, 1967
 Amphibalanus Pitombo, 2004
 Archiacasta Kolbasov, 1993
 Armatobalanus Hoek, 1913
 Arossia Newman, 1982
 Austromegabalanus Newman, 1979
 Balanus Costa, 1778 (barnacle)
 Bathybalanus Hoek, 1913
 Bryozobia Ross & Newman, 1996
 Chesaconcavus Zullo, 1992
 Chirona Gray, 1835
 Concavus Newman, 1982
 Conopea Say, 1822
 Eoatria Van Syoc & Newman, 2010
 Euacasta Kolbasov, 1993
 Fistulobalanus Zullo, 1984
 Fosterella Buckeridge, 1983
 Hesperibalanus Pilsbry, 1916
 Hexacreusia Zullo, 1961
 Megabalanus Hoek, 1913
 Membranobalanus Hoek, 1913
 Menesiniella Newman, 1982
 Microporatria Van Syoc & Newman, 2010
 Multatria Van Syoc & Newman, 2010
 Neoacasta Kolbasov, 1993
 Notobalanus Newman & Ross, 1976
 Notomegabalanus Newman, 1979
 Paraconcavus Zullo, 1992
 Pectinoacasta Kolbasov, 1993
 Perforatus Pitombo, 2004
 Poratria Van Syoc & Newman, 2010
 Pseudoacasta Nilsson-Cantell, 1930
 Semibalanus Pilsbry, 1916
 Solidobalanus Hoek, 1913
 Striatobalanus Hoek, 1913
 Tamiosoma Conrad, 1857
 Tasmanobalanus Buckeridge, 1983
 Tetrabalanus Cornwall, 1941
 Wanella Anderson, 1993
 Zulloa Ross & Newman, 1996
 Zulloana Pitombo & Ross, 2002
 † Alessandriella Carriol & Cahuzac, 2001
 † Archaeobalanus Menesini, 1971
 † Kathpalmeria Ross, 1965
 † Palaeobalanus Buckeridge, 1983
 † Paractinobalanus Carriol, 2008
 † Porobalanus Buckeridge, 2015
 † Zullobalanus Buckeridge, 1989
 † Zulloconcavus Carriol, 2000

References

External links

Barnacles
Crustacean families